Saval  is a small remote hamlet, surrounded by Dalchork Wood, 1.5 miles northeast of the village of Lairg, in Sutherland, Scottish Highlands and is in the Scottish council area of Highland.

References

Populated places in Sutherland